Chamsulvara Chamsulvarayev (September 6, 1984 – September 28, 2016) was a Russian male freestyle wrestler who represented Azerbaijan. He was born in Sergokalinsky, Dagestan, Russia.

Career
He participated in Men's freestyle 74 kg at 2008 Summer Olympics. He was eliminated from the competition losing to Murad Gaidarov in the 1/8 of final. He won a bronze medal on 2007 FILA Wrestling World Championships. He was killed in Mosul, Iraq after joining the Islamic State of Iraq and the Levant.

References

External links
 
 Wrestler bio on NBC.com 

1984 births
2016 deaths
Wrestlers at the 2008 Summer Olympics
Olympic wrestlers of Azerbaijan
Azerbaijani male sport wrestlers
World Wrestling Championships medalists
Islamic State of Iraq and the Levant members
European Wrestling Championships medalists
Azerbaijani military personnel killed in action
Military personnel killed in the Syrian civil war